Pierre Guillaumat (5 August 1909 – 28 August 1991) was a Minister of National Education and Minister of the Armies under French President Charles de Gaulle and founder of the Elf Aquitaine oil company in 1967. He was born in La Flèche, Sarthe, the son of French general Adolphe Guillaumat.

1909 births
1991 deaths
People from La Flèche
Politicians from Pays de la Loire
French Ministers of Defence
French Ministers of National Education
Politicians of the French Fifth Republic
French Resistance members
French people of the Algerian War
French chief executives
École Polytechnique alumni
Mines Paris - PSL alumni
Corps des mines
TotalEnergies people
Grand Croix of the Légion d'honneur